Thomas & Friends is a children's television series about the engines and other characters on the railways of the Island of Sodor, and is based on The Railway Series books written by the Reverend W. Awdry.

This article lists and details episodes from the nineteenth series of the show, which was first broadcast in 2015. The series is narrated by Mark Moraghan, for both the UK and US audiences.

A new DVD titled "Whale of a Tale and Other Sodor Adventures" (containing 5 episodes) was released exclusively to Walmart and iTunes in the US on 9 June 2015. A 2nd DVD called "Wild Water Rescue and Other Engine Adventures" (containing 1 episode from Series 19) was released a week later on 16 June 2015, exclusively to Target.
 
A 3rd DVD called "Thomas' Christmas Carol" (containing 4 episodes from Series 19) was released on 27 October 2015, while a 4th DVD titled "Tales on the Rails" (containing a further 3 episodes from Series 19) was released a month later on 24 November 2015. A fifth DVD titled, "Start Your Engines!" was released on 1 March 2016 in the US and 14 March 2016 in the UK.

Episodes

Notes

References

2015 American television seasons
2015 British television seasons
2016 American television seasons
2016 British television seasons
2017 American television seasons
2017 British television seasons
Thomas & Friends seasons